Tori-Ellis Willetts (born 25 May 1995) is a British Army gunner and amateur boxer.

Tori-Ellis won the England Elite championships in 2017 and 2018 representing UKAF BA. In 2017 she also won Gold at the Three nations (GB’S) in Sheffield representing England.

In 2019 Willetts was selected to compete at the World Championships in Ulan-Ude, Russia, where she lost by unanimous decision to Gabriela Dimitrova in the round of 32.

References

1995 births
Living people
English women boxers
Royal Artillery soldiers